The Hongguang Emperor (1607–1646), personal name Zhu Yousong, childhood nickname Fuba (福八), was the first emperor of the Chinese Southern Ming dynasty. He reigned briefly in southern China from 1644 to 1645. His era name, "Hongguang", means "great light".

In 1646, Zhu Yousong was captured and executed by the Qing dynasty at the Caishikou Execution Grounds.

Early life
Zhu Yousong was a member of Ming imperial family. He was eldest son of Zhu Changxun, and a grandson of the Wanli Emperor and Noble Consort Zheng. He followed his father to his fief at Luoyang in 1614 and later was granted the title "Commandery Prince of Dechang" (德昌郡王). He was later designated as Hereditary Prince of Fu.

In 1641, Li Zicheng's forces invaded Luoyang, and Zhu managed to escape but his father was killed. He held his father's princely title in two years later. In 1644, he escaped again to Weihui to seek asylum from his distant uncle, Zhu Changfang, Prince of Lu (grandson of the Longqing Emperor and nephew of the Wanli Emperor). They later escaped to Huai'an together, and were on the same boat with Zhu Gonghao, Prince of Zhou and Zhu Cilun, Prince of Chong. On 25 April, the Chongzhen Emperor committed suicide.

Accession to the throne

Chongzhen's death
The news of the Chongzhen Emperor's suicide was met with consternation when it reached Nanjing in mid May 1644. The highest officials in Nanjing soon met to deliberate about how to face the crisis. Since the fate of the official heir apparent was still unknown at the time, many thought it was too early to proclaim a new emperor, but most agreed that an imperial figure was necessary to rally loyalist support for the Ming in the south.

From the perspective of pedigree, the Taichang Emperor had only two sons: Tianqi and Chongzhen emperors. The Tianqi Emperor was sonless, and the three sons of the Chongzhen Emperor were missing. The successor can be only choose from uncles of the Chongzhen Emperor, which were brothers of the Taichang Emperor and other sons of the Wanli Emperor. Zhu Changxun, Prince of Fu was Wanli's 3rd son, Zhu Changhao, Prince of Rui was the 5th son, Zhu Changrun, Prince of Hui was the 6th son and the youngest was Zhu Changying, Prince of Gui (Zhu Youlang's father). Among these imperial uncles, Zhu Changxun was the eldest uncle, and Zhu Yousong was the eldest son of Zhu Changxun. As the imperial sons were missing, Zhu Yousong became the first in line to the succession.

Support of officials

In early June 1644, the court decided that the caretaker government would be centered around Zhu Yousong, Prince of Fu, who was next in line for succession after the dead emperor's sons. When he arrived in the vicinity of Nanjing (he had come from his princedom in Henan), the Prince could count on the military and political support of Ma Shiying (馬士英). Many officers allied with the Donglin Movement preferred Zhu Changfang, Prince of Lu to succeed. On June 5 the Prince of Fu entered the city, the next day he accepted the title of "Protector of the State" (監國, sometimes translated as "Regent"), and on June 7 he moved into the imperial palace, where he received the insignia of his new office.

Three choices for throne

 Zhu Zaihou, the Longqing Emperor
3  Zhu Yijun, the Wanli Emperor
1  Zhu Changluo, the Taichang Emperor
1  Zhu Youjiao, the Tianqi Emperor
5  Zhu Youjian, the Chongzhen Emperor
3 Zhu Changxun, Prince Zhong of Fu
1  Zhu Yousong, Prince of Fu
7 Zhu Changying, Prince of Gui
4 Zhu Yiliu, Prince Jian of Lu
1 Zhu Changfang, Prince of Lu

Reign

Prodded by some court officials, the Prince of Fu immediately started to consider becoming Emperor. Fearing confrontation with Ma Shiying and other supporters of the Prince, Shi Kefa convinced reluctant members of the court to accept the enthronement. The Prince of Fu was officially crowned as emperor on June 19, 1644, under the protection of Ma Shiying, who had arrived in Nanjing two days earlier with a large war fleet. It was decided that the next lunar year would be "the first year of the Hongguang reign" (弘光元年) with the capital city of Nanjing. The Hongguang court proclaimed that its goal was "to ally with the Tartars to pacify the bandits" (聯虜平寇), that is, to seek co-operation with Qing military forces in order to annihilate rebel peasant militia led by Li Zicheng and Zhang Xianzhong.

The Hongguang regime had been being plagued by political struggles from the beginning between the party which was formerly pro-Wei Zhongxian, including the influential officer Ma Shiying, and the pro-Donglin Movement party, including General Shi Kefa. Shi Kefa, who was sent to defend the area north of the Yangtze, could not have support from Ma Shiying. Even the generals in the front attacked each other for power and looted the civilians.

In 1645, the Qing army moved rapidly and captured Suzhou,. Subsequently, on 25 April of the same year, Yangzhou also fell to the Qing army. General Shi Kefa, who defended Yangzhou, attempted suicide, survived, and was captured. Prince Dodo of the Qing spared his life and even offered Shi a position. Shi, however, remained loyal to the Ming, so he refused the offer and was executed.

When the news reached Nanjing, the Hongguang Emperor, Ma Shiying and a few eunuchs fled in panic to Wuhu city. On May 15, Minister Zhao Long, Wang Feng, Qian Xian surrendered to the Qing. As a result, Nanjing and a few other cities fell.

The Hongguang Emperor fled into Anhui on the Yangzi's southern bank at Tongling, in Huang Degong's military camp. Huang Degong told him that if he died fighting to the death in Nanjing then all the ministers would have followed his lead in fighting against the Qing, but now that he fled without a fight and listened to traitors his small army could not act as a guard for the emperor. Huang Degong then said "I am willing to devote my life to you" after the emperor said he could not rely on him as a minister resentfully. Then a group of Qing Han Chinese and Banner soldiers showed up in Wuhu to Huang Degong's camp on June 15 under Zhang Tianlu, the Guazhou garrison commander, bannermen from Dodo and general Liu Liangzuo. Huang Degong rejected their demanded to turn over the Hongguang emperor but Zhang Tianlu then shot an arrow into Huang's throat and he died. Tian Xiong and Ma Deong, the brigade commanders under Huang Degong then defected to the Qing and gave General Liu the Hongguang Emperor. Hongguang was captured on May 28.

Manchu Qing Prince of Yu, Dodo berated and attacked Zhu Yousong over his battle strategy in 1645, telling him that the Southern Ming would have defeated the Qing if only the Southern Ming assaulted the Qing military before they forded the Yellow river. The Prince of Fu could find no words to respond when he tried to defend himself.

Death
Hongguang was captured and sent to Beijing to face the Qing court. He was then executed in 1646 at Caishikou, which ended his reign as the Southern Ming emperor. The last remnants of the Ming resistance were finally destroyed in 1662.

Family
Consorts and Issue:
Empress Xiaozhejian, of the Huang clan (孝哲坚皇后 黄氏)
Empress Xiaoyi, of the Li clan (孝义皇后 李氏)
Noble Consort, of the Jin clan  (金貴妃)
Consort, of the Tong clan (童妃)
Consort, of the Wang clan (汪妃)
Consort, of the Chen clan (陳妃)
Lady of Gentleness, of the Huang clan (淑女 黃氏)
Lady of Gentleness, of the Guo clan (淑女 郭氏)
Lady of Selected Service, of the Mou clan (選侍 某氏)
Palace Lady, of the Zhang clan (宮人 張氏)
Palace Lady, of the Wang clan (宮人 王氏)
Ye Zimei (葉子眉)
Palace Lady, of the Xu clan (宮人 徐氏), personal name Shuxiu (淑秀)
Unknown
A daughter

Ancestry

In popular culture
The Peach Blossom Fan (桃花扇), a historical drama completed in 1699 by Kong Shangren, depicted the life under the Hongguang regime. The work has been adapted into various plays, including the televised 16-episode Taiwanese opera "Qinhuai Yanyu (秦淮煙雨)" in 2001.
Portrayed by Lee Keun-hee in the 1981 KBS1 TV Series Daemyeong.

Notes

References

Southern Ming emperors
Murdered Chinese emperors
1607 births
1646 deaths
Executed Ming dynasty people
People executed by the Qing dynasty by decapitation
Executed people from Beijing
People murdered in Beijing
17th-century Chinese monarchs
17th-century executions by China
Executed monarchs
Founding monarchs